Anystipalpus percicola is a species of mite in the family Laelapidae.

References

Laelapidae
Articles created by Qbugbot
Animals described in 1911